Enoch Walter Sikes (May 19, 1868 – January 8, 1941) was an American football player and coach, professor, state senator, and college president.  He served as the head football coach at Wake Forest University from 1891 to 1893, compiling a record of 6–2–1.  Sikes taught history and political economics at Wake Forest from 1897 to 1916.  He served one term in the North Carolina Senate, representing Wake County in 1911.  Sikes was the president of Coker College from 1916 to 1925 and the president of Clemson University from 1925 until his retirement in 1940.  He died of a heart attack on January 8, 1941, in Clemson, South Carolina.

Head coaching record

References

External links
 

1868 births
1941 deaths
19th-century players of American football
American football guards
Presidents of Clemson University
Coker University people
Johns Hopkins University alumni
North Carolina state senators
Wake Forest University faculty
Wake Forest Demon Deacons football coaches
Wake Forest Demon Deacons football players
People from Union County, North Carolina